The Mali women's national under-18 and under-19  is a national basketball team of Mali and is governed by the Fédération Malienne de Basketball. It represents Mali in international under-19 and under-18 (under age 19 and under age 18) women's basketball competitions.

See also
 Mali women's national basketball team
 Mali women's national under-17 basketball team

References

under
Women's national under-18 basketball teams
Women's national under-19 basketball teams